Henry Murphy (19 May 1912, Ardpatrick – 8 October 1973, Limerick) was an Irish Roman Catholic bishop.

Murphy was educated at St Munchin's College and St Patrick's College, Maynooth. He was ordained priest on 21 June 1936. He received the degree of Doctor of Divinity (DD). He was on the staff at St Munchins from 1938 until his consecration as Bishop of Limerick on 31 August 1958. He served as Secretary of the Irish Episcopal Conference and he attended all the sessions of the Second Vatican Council. He died in post. He is buried in Mount Lawrenc Cemetery, Limerick.

References

1912 births
Bishops of Limerick
1973 deaths
20th-century Roman Catholic bishops in Ireland
Alumni of St Patrick's College, Maynooth